Chiang Mai (from), sometimes written as Chiengmai or Chiangmai, is the largest city in northern Thailand, the capital of Chiang Mai province and the second largest city in Thailand.

Chiang Mai (meaning "New City" in Thai) was founded in 1296 as the new capital of Lan Na, succeeding the former capital, Chiang Rai. The city's location on the Ping River (a major tributary of the Chao Phraya River) and its proximity to major trading routes contributed to its historic importance.

The city (thesaban nakhon, "city municipality") of Chiang Mai officially only covers most parts (40,2 km²) of the Mueang Chiang Mai district in the city centre and has a population of 127,000. This census area dates back to 1983 when Chiang Mai's municipal area was enlarged for the first and last time since becoming the first City Municipality in Thailand (then under Siam) in 1935. The city's sprawl has since extended into several neighboring districts, from Hang Dong in the south, to Mae Rim in the north, and Suthep in the west, to San Kamphaeng in the east, forming the Chiang Mai urban area with a size of 2,303 km².

The city municipality is subdivided into four khwaeng (electoral wards): Nakhon Ping, Sriwichai, Mengrai, and Kawila. The first three are on the west bank of the Ping River, and Kawila is on the east bank. Nakhon Ping District includes the northern part of the city. Sriwichai, Mengrai, and Kawila consist of the western, southern, and eastern parts, respectively. The city center—within the city walls—is mostly within Sriwichai ward.

History 

Mangrai founded Chiang Mai in 1294 or 1296 on a site that the Lawa people called Wiang Nopburi.

Chiang Mai succeeded Chiang Rai as the capital of Lan Na. Pha Yu enlarged and fortified the city, and built Wat Phra Singh in honor of his father Kham Fu.  The ruler was known as the chao. The city was surrounded by a moat and a defensive wall since nearby Taungoo Dynasty of the Bamar people was a constant threat, as were the armies of the Mongol Empire, which decades earlier had conquered most of Yunnan, China, and in 1292 overran the bordering Dai kingdom of Chiang Hung.

With the decline of Lan Na, the city lost importance and was occupied by the Taungoo in 1556. Chiang Mai formally became part of the Thonburi Kingdom in 1774 by an agreement with Chao Kavila, after the Thonburi king Taksin helped drive out the Taungoo Bamar. Subsequent Taungoo counterattack led to Chiang Mai's abandonment between 1776 and 1791. Lampang then served as the capital of what remained of Lan Na. Chiang Mai then slowly grew in cultural, trading, and economic importance to its current status as the unofficial capital of Northern Thailand.

Chiang Mai has improved its government and raised its status as a "province" since 1933 until the present.

The modern municipality dates to a sanitary district (sukhaphiban) that was created in 1915. It was upgraded to a city municipality (thesaban nakhon) on 29 March 1935.

In May 2006 Chiang Mai was the site of the Chiang Mai Initiative, concluded between the Association of Southeast Asian Nations and the "ASEAN+3" countries, (China, Japan, and South Korea). Chiang Mai was one of three Thai cities contending for Thailand's bid to host the World Expo 2020. Ayutthaya was ultimately chosen by the Thai Parliament to register for the international competition.

In early December 2017, Chiang Mai was awarded the UNESCO title of Creative City. In 2015, Chiang Mai was on the tentative list for UNESCO World Heritage inscription. Chiang Mai was one of two tourist destinations in Thailand on TripAdvisor's 2014 list of "25 Best Destinations in the World", where it stands at number 24.

Population 
Ever since the municipal city area was enlarged to 40,2 km² in 1983, no changes or updates have been made to it, even with the population increasing substantially in the years after. In 1983, Chiang Mai's urban area, with a population of 127,000, already exceeded the municipal city limits, and has grown to over one million people in 2022.

What was once the majority of Chiang Mai's city area, has now become a small part of the expanded city-scape, making up only most parts of Mueang Chiang Mai district in the inner city. In official plans by the Chiang Mai Provincial Administrative Organization, published in the Royal Thai Government Gazette, the new and up to date city boundaries have been included and outlined, expanding the old municipal city border inside Muaeng Chiang Mai district to Mae Rim in the north, San Kamphaeng in the east, Hang Dong in the south and Suthep in the west. This new extent, with a size of 2,303 km², forms not only the complete Chiang Mai urban area, but is also roughly the same size as the Chiang Mai metropolitan region.

The whole area has a combined population of 1,198,000 residents, making Chiang Mai the second largest city in Thailand after Bangkok (10.7 million people) and twice as big as the third largest city Nakhon Ratchasima (Estimate: 500,000 people). As neither the Department of Local Administration (DLA) nor the National Statistics Office (NSO) count expatriates, non-permanent residents, migrant workers (except ASEAN migrants for the year 2017) and citizens from other Thai provinces living and renting in Chiang Mai in their official population figures, it is estimated that the real population figure for Chiang Mai could be as high as 1.5 million. 

Due to the outdated counting method of registered residents, Chiang Mai's true size is often misinterpreted and misrepresented, unintentionally mitigating the city's importance in Thailand.

Emblem 

The city emblem shows the stupa at Wat Phra That Doi Suthep in its center. Below it are clouds representing the moderate climate in the mountains of northern Thailand. There is a nāga, the mythical snake said to be the source of the Ping River, and rice stalks, which refer to the fertility of the land.

Religious sites 
Chiang Mai city has 117 Buddhist temples ("wat" in Thai) in the Muang (city) district. These include:
 Wat Phra That Doi Suthep, the city's most famous temple, stands on Doi Suthep, a mountain to the north-west of the city, at an elevation of 1,073 meters. The temple dates from 1383.
 Wat Chiang Man, the oldest temple in Chiang Mai, dating from the 13th century. King Mengrai lived here during the construction of the city. This temple houses two important and venerated Buddha figures, the marble Phra Sila and the crystal Phra Satang Man.
 Wat Phra Singh is within the city walls, dates from 1345, and offers an example of classic Northern Thai-style architecture. It houses the Phra Singh Buddha, a highly venerated figure brought here many years ago from Chiang Rai.
 Wat Chedi Luang was founded in 1401 and is dominated by a large Lanna style chedi, which took many years to finish. An earthquake damaged the chedi in the 16th century and only two-thirds of it remains.
 Wat Ku Tao in the city's Chang Phuak District dates from (at least) the 13th century and is distinguished by an unusual alms-bowl-shaped stupa thought to contain the ashes of King Nawrahta Minsaw, Chiang Mai's first Bamar ruler.
 Wat Chet Yot is on the outskirts of the city. Built in 1455, the temple hosted the Eighth World Buddhist Council in 1477.
 Wiang Kum Kam is at the site of an old city in the Tha Wang Tan sub-district of the Saraphi district south of Chiang Mai. King Mangrai lived there for ten years before the founding of Chiang Mai. The site includes many ruined temples.
 Wat Umong is a forest and cave wat in the foothills west of the city, near Chiang Mai University. Wat U-Mong is known for its "fasting Buddha", representing the Buddha at the end of his long and fruitless fast prior to gaining enlightenment.
 Wat RamPoeng (Tapotaram), near Wat U-Mong, is known for its meditation center (Northern Insight Meditation Center). The temple teaches the traditional vipassanā technique and students stay from 10 days to more than a month as they try to meditate at least 10 hours a day. Wat RamPoeng houses the largest collection of Tipitaka, the complete Theravada canon, in several Northern dialects.
 Wat Suan Dok is a 14th-century temple just west of the old city wall. It was built by the king for a revered monk visiting from Sukhothai for a rainy season retreat. The temple is also the site of Mahachulalongkorn Rajavidyalaya Buddhist University, where monks pursue their studies.

In addition to the currently active temples there are several temple ruins scattered around the present-day city area. Typically only the main stupa remains as it is a brick and cement structure, with other temple buildings no longer there. There are 44 of such structures in the city area, ranging from very prominent landmarks to small remnants that have almost completely disappeared or are overgrown with vegetation.

Other religious traditions:
 "First Church"  was founded in 1868 by the Laos Mission of the Rev. Daniel and Mrs. Sophia McGilvary. Chiang Mai has about 20 Christian churches Chiang Mai is the seat of the Roman Catholic Diocese of Chiang Mai at Sacred Heart Cathedral.
 The office of the Christian Conference of Asia is located in Chiang Mai.
 Muslim traders have traveled to north Thailand for many centuries, and a small settled presence has existed in Chiang Mai from at least the middle of the 19th century. The city has mosques identified with Chinese or Chin Haw Muslims as well as Muslims of Bengali, Pathan, and Malay descent. In 2011, there were 16 mosques in the city.
 Two gurdwaras (Sikh places of worship), Siri Guru Singh Sabha and Namdhari, serve the city's Sikh community.
 The Hindu temple Dev Mandir serves the Hindu community.

Administration 
The Administration of Chiang Mai Municipality is responsible for an area that covers approximately 40.216 square kilometers and consists of 4 Municipal Districts, 14 sub-districts, 94 municipal communities, and  89,656 households.

According to Municipal Act B.E. 2496 (1953, reviewed in 2003), the duties of the Municipality cover a lot of areas which include clean water supply, waste and sewage disposal, communicable disease control, public training and education, public hospitals and electricity, etc.

The mayor, or the highest executive, is directly elected by the eligible voters in the municipal area. The mayor serves a four-year term and is assisted by no more than four deputy mayors appointed directly by the mayor. The mayor will thus be permitted to appoint deputies, secretaries and advisors including the mayor himself or herself totally no more than 10. The current Mayor is Tussanai Burabupakorn, as of June 2018.

The Municipal Council is the legislative body of the municipality. It has the power to issue ordinances by laws that do not contradict with the laws of the country. The municipal council applies to all people living in the municipal area. The Chiang Mai City Municipal Council is composed of 24 elected members from 4 municipal districts who each serves a 4-year term.

Culture

Festivals 

Chiang Mai hosts many Thai festivals, including:
 Loi Krathong (known locally as Yi Peng), held on the full moon of the 12th month of the traditional Thai lunar calendar, being the full moon of the second month of the old Lanna calendar. In the Western calendar this usually falls in November. Every year thousands of people assemble floating banana-leaf containers (krathong) decorated with flowers and candles and deposit them on the waterways of the city in worship of the Goddess of Water. Lanna-style sky lanterns (khom fai or kom loi), which are hot-air balloons made of paper, are launched into the air. These sky lanterns are believed to help rid the locals of troubles and are also used to decorate houses and streets.
 Songkran is held in mid-April to celebrate the traditional Thai New Year. Chiang Mai has become one of the most popular locations to visit during this festival. A variety of religious and fun-related activities (notably the indiscriminate citywide water fight) take place each year, along with parades and Miss Songkran beauty competition.
 Chiang Mai Flower Festival is a three-day festival held during the first weekend in February each year; this event occurs when Chiang Mai's temperate and tropical flowers are in full bloom.
 Tam Bun Khan Dok, the Inthakhin (City Pillar) Festival, starts on the day of the waning moon of the sixth lunar month and lasts 6–8 days.
Notable local Buddhist celebrations are Visakha Bucha Day at Doi Suthep (mountain) where thousands of Buddhists make the journey on foot after sunset, from the bottom of the mountain to the temple at the top Wat Doi Suthep. Makha Bucha Day is celebrated at large temples (Wat Phra Singh, Wat Chedi Luang, Wat Phra That Doi Suthep, and Wat Sri Soda) with thousands of attendees.

Language 
While most inhabitants speak Thai, there are many older inhabitants that also speak the former Lan Na Kingdom's unique language known as Northern Thai, Lanna or Kham Mueang. The script used to write this language, called the Tai Tham alphabet, is studied only by scholars, and the language is commonly written with the standard Thai alphabet. Thai, English, Chinese, and Japanese are used in hotels and travel-related businesses.

Museums 
 Chiang Mai City Arts and Cultural Center
 Chiang Mai National Museum, which highlights the history of the region and the Kingdom of Lan Na.
 Chiang Mai Philatelic Museum, showing the history of postage stamps and postal development of Thailand, especially of Chiang Mai. 
 Highland People Discovery Museum, a showcase on the history of the local mountain tribes.
 Mint Bureau of Chiang Mai or Sala Thanarak, Treasury Department, Ministry of Finance, Rajdamnern Road (one block from AUA Language Center).  Has an old coin museum open to the public during business hours. The Lan Na Kingdom used leaf (or line) money made of brass and silver bubbles, also called "pig-mouth" money. The exact original technique of making pig-mouth money is still disputed, and because the silver is very thin and breakable, good pieces are now very rare.
 Bank of Thailand Museum
 Northern Telecoms of Thailand Museum, housed in a former telephone exchange building, displaying the history and evolution of telecommunications in Northern Thailand. 
 MAIIAM Contemporary Art Museum, a museum of contemporary art which opened in 2016.  It is one of only two museums of contemporary art in Thailand, with the other museum, the Museum of Contemporary Art of Bangkok, considered somewhat more conservative in tastes than MAIIAM.

Dining 
Khan tok is a century-old Lan Na Thai tradition in Chiang Mai. It is an elaborate dinner or lunch offered by a host to guests at various ceremonies or parties, such as weddings, housewarmings, celebrations, novice ordinations, or funerals. It can also be held in connection with celebrations for specific buildings in a Thai temple and during Buddhist festivals such as Khao Pansa, Og Pansa, Loi Krathong, and Thai New Year (Songkran).

Khao Soi is a Northern Thai noodle curry dish found mostly in Chiang Mai. Khao Soi is usually presented in a simple bowl, with fresh lime wedge, shallots, and pickled cabbage.

Education 
Chiang Mai has several universities, including Chiang Mai University, Chiang Mai Rajabhat University, Rajamangala University of Technology Lanna, Payap University, Far Eastern University, and Maejo University, as well as numerous technical and teacher colleges. Chiang Mai University was the first government university established outside of Bangkok. Payap University was the first private institution in Thailand to be granted university status.

International primary and secondary schools for foreign students include:
 American Pacific International School
 Chiang Mai International School
 Christian German School Chiang Mai
 French School of the Far East, an institute for Asian studies, has a centre in Chiang Mai.
 Grace International School
 Lanna International School
 Nakornpayap International School
 Prem Tinsulanonda International School

Environment

Climate 
Chiang Mai has a tropical savanna climate (Köppen Aw), tempered by the low latitude and moderate elevation, with warm to hot weather year-round, though nighttime conditions during the dry season can be cool and much lower than daytime highs. Cold and hot weather effects occur immediately but cold effects last longer than hot effects and contribute to higher cold related mortality risk among old people aged more than 85 years.

Air pollution 
A continuing environmental issue in Chiang Mai is the incidence of air pollution that primarily occurs every year between December and April. In 1996, speaking at the Fourth International Network for Environmental Compliance and Enforcement conference—held in Chiang Mai that year—the Governor Virachai Naewboonien invited guest speaker Dr. Jakapan Wongburanawatt, Dean of the Social Science Faculty of Chiang Mai University, to discuss air pollution efforts in the region. Dr. Wongburanawatt stated that, in 1994, an increasing number of city residents attended hospitals suffering from respiratory problems associated with the city's air pollution.

During the December–April period, air quality in Chiang Mai often remains below recommended standards, with fine-particle dust levels reaching twice the standard limits. It has been said that smoke pollution has made March "the worst month to visit Chiang Mai".

According to the Bangkok Post, corporations in the agricultural sector, not farmers, are the biggest contributors to smoke pollution. The main source of the fires is forested area being cleared to make room for new crops. The new crops to be planted after the smoke clears are not rice and vegetables to feed locals. A single crop is responsible: corn.

"The true source of the haze... sits in the boardrooms of corporations eager to expand production and profits. A chart of Thailand's growth in world corn markets can be overlaid on a chart of the number of fires. It is no longer acceptable to scapegoat hill tribes and slash-and-burn agriculture for the severe health and economic damage caused by this annual pollution." These data have been ignored by the government. The end is not in sight, as the number of fires has increased every year for a decade, and data shows more pollution in late-February 2016 than in late-February 2015.

The northern centre of the Meteorological Department has reported that low-pressure areas from China trap forest fire smoke in the mountains along the Thai-Myanmar border. Research conducted between 2005 and 2009 showed that average PM10 rates in Chiang Mai during February and March were considerably above the country's safety level of 120 μg/m³, peaking at 383 μg/m³ on 14 March 2007.  PM2.5 rates (fine particles 75% smaller than PM10) reached 183 μg/m³ in Chiang Mai in 2018. According to the World Health Organization (WHO), the acceptable level of PM10 is 50 μg/m³ and PM2.5 is 25 μg/m³.

To address the increasing amount of greenhouse gas emissions from the transport sector in Chiang Mai, the city government has advocated the use of non-motorised transport (NMT). In addition to its potential to reduce greenhouse gas emissions, the NMT initiative addresses other issues such as traffic congestion, air quality, income generation for the poor, and the long-term viability of the tourism industry.

Effects of tourism 
The influx of tourists has put a strain on the city's natural resources. Faced with rampant unplanned development, air and water pollution, waste management problems, and traffic congestion, the city has launched a non-motorised transport (NMT) system. The initiative, developed by a partnership of experts and with support from the Climate & Development Knowledge Network, aims to reduce greenhouse gas emissions and create employment opportunities for the urban poor. The climate compatible development strategy has gained support from policy-makers and citizens alike.

Nature 

 Nearby national parks include Doi Inthanon National Park, which includes Doi Inthanon, the highest mountain in Thailand
 Doi Suthep–Pui National Park begins on the western edge of the city. Wat Doi Suthep Buddhist temple, located near the summit of Doi Suthep, can be seen from much of the city and its environs. In 2015, a development plan around the temple for a new housing project threatened to destroy some of the forest, but was halted, resulting in reforestation of the park.
 Pha Daeng National Park, or more commonly Chiang Dao National Park, which includes Doi Chiang Dao and Pha Deang mountain near the border with Myanmar.
 Hill tribe tourism and trekking: Many tour companies offer organized treks among the local hills and forests on foot and on elephant back. Most also involve visits to various local hill tribes, including the Akha, Hmong, Karen, and Lisu.
 Queen Sirikit Botanic Garden
 Buatong waterfall (also called Sticky Waterfalls) - The formation of calcium lets you easily climb barefoot.

Recreation 
 Chiang Mai Zoo, the oldest zoo in northern Thailand.
 Shopping destinations: Chiang Mai has a large and famous night bazaar for local arts and handicrafts. The night markets extend across several city blocks along footpaths, inside buildings and temple grounds, and in open squares. A handicraft and food market opens every Sunday afternoon until late at night on Rachadamnoen Road, the main street in the historical centre, which is then closed to motorised traffic. Every Saturday evening a handicraft market is held along Wua Lai Road, Chiang Mai's silver street on the south side of the city beyond Chiang Mai Gate, which is then also closed to motorised traffic.
 Shopping Malls: Besides Bangkok, until recently, Chiang Mai offered the most Big-Brand shopping malls. As of now there are three shopping malls operating in Chiang Mai: Central Chiang Mai Airport, Central Chiang Mai and Maya Shopping Mall. Two well known malls, Promenada and Kad Suan Kaew, had to close permanently in 2022 as a result of the COVID-19 pandemic causing low foot-traffic and lower spending by visitors.
 Thai massage: The back streets and main thoroughfares of Chiang Mai have many massage parlours which offer anything from quick, simple, face and foot massages, to month-long courses in the art of Thai massage.
 Thai cookery: A number of Thai cooking schools have their home in Chiang Mai.
 For IT shopping, Pantip Plaza just south of Night Bazaar (few shops open due to COVID-19 pandemic), as well as Computer Plaza, Computer City, and Icon Square near the northwestern moat corner.
 Horse racing: Every Saturday starting at 12:30 there are races at Kawila Race Track. Betting is legal. 
 Chiang Mai is also to be the place where new idol group CGM48 founded.
Buak Hat Public Park: Located in the south west corner of the Old City.
Ang Keaw Reservoir: Located near the northern entrance to Chiang Mai University.

Health 
The largest hospital in Chiang Mai City is Maharaj Nakorn Chiang Mai Hospital, run by the Faculty of Medicine, Chiang Mai University. The Ministry of Public Health does not operate any hospitals in Chiang Mai City, with the closest one Nakornping Hospital, a regional hospital in Mae Rim District and is the MOPH's largest hospital in the province.

Transportation 

A number of bus stations link the city to central, southeast, and northern Thailand. The central Chang Puak Terminal (north of Chiang Puak Gate) provides local services within Chiang Mai Province. The Chiang Mai Arcade bus terminal northeast of the city centre (which can be reached with a songthaew or tuk-tuk ride) provides services to over 20 other destinations in Thailand including Bangkok, Pattaya, Hua Hin, and Phuket. There are several services a day from Chiang Mai Arcade terminal to Mo Chit Station in Bangkok (a 10- to 12-hour journey).

The state railway operates 10 trains a day to Chiang Mai railway station from Bangkok. Most journeys run overnight and take approximately 12–15 hours. Most trains offer first-class (private cabins) and second-class (seats fold out to make sleeping berths) service. Chiang Mai is the northern terminus of the Thai railway system.

Chiang Mai International Airport receives an average of 50 flights a day from Bangkok (25 from Suvarnabhumi and also 25 from Don Mueang, flight time about 1 hour 10 minutes) and also serves as a local hub for services to other northern cities such as Chiang Rai, Phrae, and Mae Hong Son. International services also connect Chiang Mai with other regional centers, including cities in other Asian countries.

The locally preferred form of transport is personal motorbike and, increasingly, private car. Local public transport is via tuk-tuk, songthaew, bus, or rickshaw. New electric tuks-tuks were introduced into the city in June 2017.

As population density continues to grow, greater pressure is placed upon the city's transportation system. During peak hours, the road traffic is often badly congested. The city officials as well as researchers and experts have been trying to find feasible solutions to tackle the city's traffic problems. Most of them agree that factors such as lack of public transport, increasing number of motor vehicles, inefficient land use plan and urban sprawl, have led to these problems.

The latest development is that Mass Rapid Transit Authority of Thailand (MRTA) has approved a draft decree on the light railway transit system project in Chiang Mai. If the draft is approved by the Thai cabinet, the construction could begin in 2020 and be completed by 2027. It is believed that such a system would mitigate Chiang Mai's traffic problems to a large degree.

"Smart City" initiative 
In February 2017, the Digital Economy Promotion Agency (DEPA) (under Thailand's Digital Economy and Society Ministry) announced that 36.5 million baht would be invested into developing Chiang Mai into an innovation-driven "smart city". Chiang Mai was the second city in Thailand, after Phuket and along with Khon Kaen, to be developed using the "smart city" model. The model aims to capture and populate multiple levels of information (including building, social, environmental, governmental, and economic data) from sources like sensors, real-time traffic information, and social forums for access by managers, governments, and citizens using mobile apps, tablets, and dashboards. The "Smart City" outlook (integrating Information and Communications Technology (ICT) with the Internet of Things (IOT)), is viewed to be critical both for secondary cities with burgeoning urban population like Chiang Mai, as well as part of Thailand's move to be digital hub of ASEAN.

The role of private sector investment, together with public sector partnership, is key to promote digital entrepreneurship. Prosoft Comtech, a Thai software company, has spent 300 million baht to build its own "Oon IT Valley" on a 90 rai plot of land as a community for tech start-ups, Internet of Things technology, software programmers and business process outsourcing services. It is aimed to both increase the size of Chiang Mai's digital workforce, as well as attract foreign digital talent to Chiang Mai.

Smart transportation 
In January 2018, it was announced that Chiang Mai would be launching "Mobike In", a bike-sharing app that would see the introduction of some 500 smart bikes on the streets. The smart bikes would be available for use for both locals and tourists. It is reported that as a start, the bikes would be placed at convenient locations including the Three Kings monument, Tha Pae Gate and Suan Buak Haad Park, as well as in the old town. The "Mobike In" project is sponsored by Advanced Info Service (Thailand's largest mobile phone operator), in collaboration with the  Tourism Authority of Thailand (Chiang Mai Office), together with local universities, public and private sectors. The project aims to promote non-motorised transportation and support eco-tourism. Speaking at the launch at the Lanna Folklife Museum, Deputy Governor Puttipong Sirimart stated that the introduction of such "smart transportation" was a positive move in Chiang Mai's transformation into a "Smart City" (part of the "Thailand 4.0" vision).

Smart agriculture 
Phongsak Ariyajitphaisal, DEPA's Chiang Mai branch manager, stated that one of the areas its smart city initiative would be promoting was "smart agriculture". Eighty percent of Chiang Mai Province's population are farmers, mostly small-scale, and increasing productivity through use of ICT has the potential to improve the local economy and living standards. DEPA has also provided funding to Chiang Mai's Maejo University, to develop wireless sensor systems for better farmland irrigation techniques, to reduce use of water sprinklers and increase productivity. The university is also developing agricultural drones that can spray fertilizers and pesticides on crops which, if successful, will result in lower costs. The drones may also detect and monitor fires and smoke pollution.

Under the 2011 IBM "Smarter Cities Challenge", IBM experts recommended smarter food initiatives focused on creating agricultural data for farmers, including price modelling, farmer-focused weather forecasting tools, an e-portal to help farmers align crop production with demand, as well as branding of Chiang Mai produce. Longer-term recommendations included implementing traceability, enabling the tracking of produce from farm to consumer, smarter irrigation as well as flood control and early warning systems.

Smart healthcare 
As part of the smart city project supported by IBM, Chiang Mai is also looking to use technology to boost its presence as a medical tourism hub. In 2011, IBM launched its Smarter Cities Challenge, a three-year, 100 city, 1.6 billion baht (US$50 million) program where teams of experts study and make detailed recommendations to address local important urban issues. Chiang Mai won a grant of about US$400,000 in 2011. The IBM team focused on smarter healthcare initiatives, aimed at making Chiang Mai and the University Medical Clinic a medical hub, as well as improving efficiency of hospitals for improved service delivery. For example, healthcare providers could use real-time location tracking of patients and hospital assets to increase efficiency and build an internationally recognised service identity. Electronic medical record technology can also be adopted to standardise information exchanges to link all medical service providers, even including traditional medicine and spas. Similar ideas include linking patient databases and healthcare asset information. In partnership with the Faculty of Medicine at Chiang Mai University, the team of experts aim to enhance the quality of medical care available to the community, both urban and rural, as well as develop Chiang Mai into a centre for medical tourism with the infrastructure for supporting international visitors seeking long-term medical care.

As the largest city in northern Thailand, Chiang Mai already receives some long stay healthcare visitors, largely Japanese. Its main advantage over Bangkok is lower costs of living. Quality services at low prices are a major selling point in mainstream healthcare, dental and ophthalmologic care as well as Thai traditional medicine. Its local university is also developing specializations in robotic surgery and geriatric medicine to accommodate a future aging population.

Smart tourism 
DEPA also reported that it has developed a mobile app that uses augmented reality technology to showcase various historical attractions in Chiang Mai, in line with the government's policy to promote Chiang Mai as a world heritage city.

Tourism

The Pacific Asia Travel Association, along with the Thai Government, is largely responsible for the development of tourism in Chiang Mai. Founded in 1951 and headquartered in Bangkok, Thailand, the Pacific Asia Travel Association (PATA) is a non-profit membership association working to promote the responsible development of travel and tourism in the Asia Pacific region.

From the beginning, Chiang Mai had the right ingredients for tourism - culture, climate, hotels, people, tours, scenery, power, roads, and services - which offered golden opportunities for extended visitor stays, a desired feature for successful tourism. What the city needed was some assistance in packaging these elements. This is where PATA came in. PATA first became involved in the development of tourism in Chiang Mai in 1968. PATA’s 9th Annual Workshop was held in 1968 and based in Chiang Mai, titled “Creating a New Destination”. The workshop provided an international forum for reviewing Chiang Mai’s tourism prospects while at the same time promoting it as a second Thai tourism destination other than Bangkok. In preparation for the Workshop, PATA sent an 11-member study team to Chiang Mai “to accomplish a study of the many decisions necessary to create a destination area of Chiang Mai, including an evaluation of the existing and natural assets, opportunities for development, community participation, financing, and the marketing of the product.” 

After the 1968 Chiang Mai workshop recommendations were implemented, the number of visitors to Chiang Mai rose dramatically. The increase, however, was largely attributed to the growth of regional, not international, traffic. In fact, between 1971 and 1973, Thai visitor counts increased 23% while international visitor counts decreased by 11%. The situation was reviewed by Thailand’s National Economic and Social Development Board’s Third National Plan (1972-76), and by both the United Nations Development Program and World Bank. Their investigations concluded that a study of Chiang Mai’s airport, which appeared to be over-congested, would provide answers to the discouraging numbers of international arrivals. As a result, Lieutenant General Chalermchai Charuvastr, Thai Army General and Founder/Director of the Tourist Organization of Thailand, contacted Marvin Plake with a request for sending a task force to Chiang Mai. The task force would introduce, plan, and implement a specific ‘idea’ regarding tourism development in Chiang Mai. The proposal was accepted at a PATA Development Authority meeting in Hawaii in August, 1974. With joint cooperation from the Thai Government and Thai Airlines, the mission commenced on January 27, 1975 with Cyril Herrmann, chairman of PATA’s Environmental, Social, and Economic Planning Committee, as a project leader.

Based on findings from the task force mission, PATA produced a report entitled “Creating a Destination Area.” The study noted that the use of land laws, zoning, open space, and architectural and design controls would help preserve Chiang Mai’s environmental and cultural character. In 1977, the Thailand Tourism Organization (TOT) asked the Development Authority to send a second task force to Chiang Mai. TOT wanted this team of experts to develop and recommend ways in which Chiang Mai could encourage more domestic and international air services. PATA initiated a two-week program: first, it would attempt to build up Chiang Mai’s regional traffic, and called upon members from regional airlines and tour operators for assistance; second, once airport operations had secured regional activity, expansion into the international market would then be targeted. The second task force determined that the international market was not adequately served - flight reservations in and out of Bangkok were difficult to make, and Thai Airways services were not well marketed overseas. 

As a result of the second investigation, the second task force produced “Chiang Mai, The Introduction of International Air Service,” a report containing both short-term plans and long-term recommendations to increase the amount of international tourists in Chiang Mai. These findings were submitted to TOT to help it establish a transportation policy to complement its tourism development program. The report concluded that Chiang Mai’s cultural image was highly marketable to foreign travelers, and needed to be promoted; that present accommodations were adequate and not restraining growth; and that as long as development and preservation were carefully balanced through sound planning, Chiang Mai’s capacity for tourism would continue to increase. 

In the late 1970s, after receiving PATA’s task force recommendations via Tourist Organization of Thailand (TOT), the Thai government implemented a development plan based largely on PATA’s blueprint for Chiang Mai. These procedures could not have come at a better time, for the 1980s witnessed unprecedented visitor growth for Chiang Mai, turning tourism into the city’s most important economic activity. This increase spawned considerable expansion in other sectors as well, such as hotel, condominium, and golf course development. PATA’s involvement with Chiang Mai represented a milestone for comprehensive planning and development, and later proved to be one of PATA’s most remarkable achievements.

According to Thailand's Tourist Authority, in 2013 Chiang Mai had 14.1 million visitors: 4.6 million foreigners and 9.5 million Thais. In 2016, tourist arrivals were expected to grow by approximately 10 percent to 9.1 million, with Chinese tourists increasing by seven percent to 750,000 and international arrivals by 10 percent to 2.6 million. Tourism in Chiang Mai has been growing annually by 15 percent per year since 2011, mostly due to Chinese tourists who account for 30 percent of international arrivals. In 2015, 7.4 million tourists visited Chiang Mai. Out of these, 35 percent were foreign tourists. The number of tourists has increased with an average rate of 13.6 percent annually between 2009 and 2015. The major reasons that have made Chiang Mai a tourist attraction are its topography, climate, and cultural history.

Chiang Mai is estimated to have 32,000–40,000 hotel rooms and Chiang Mai International Airport (CNX) is Thailand's fourth largest airport, after Suvarnabhumi (BKK), Don Mueang (DMK), and Phuket (HKT). Planning is underway for a second airport with a capacity to serve 10 million annual passengers.

The Thailand Convention and Exhibition Bureau (TCEB) aims to market Chiang Mai as a global MICE city as part of a five-year plan. The TCEB forecasts revenue from MICE to rise by 10 percent to 4.24 billion baht in 2013 and the number of MICE travellers to rise by five percent to 72,424.

Tourism has also brought benefits for the local community of Chiang Mai. For example, tourism has played a tremendous role in promoting arts and crafts market in Chiang Mai. Tourists have increased demand for traditional crafts and art forms that has resulted in the incentives for the local artists to enhance their work thus adding to the prosperity of the sector.
Moreover, there are great opportunities for agritourism in Chiang Mai. The factor analysis illustrates three types of agri needs, activities and shopping, facilities, services and location and the last one attractions and environment. Agritoursim is a type of business that a farmer conducts for additional farm income. Farmers, through the promotions of agricultural products, provide enjoyment and educate public about farming and agriculture.

Notable persons

 Marc Faber - investment analyst and entrepreneur
 Jongkolphan Kititharakul – Thai badminton player, women's doubles gold medalist at the 2017 Southeast Asian Games
 Anucha Saengchart - social media personality and cosplayer
 Rodjaraeg Wattanapanit – the first Thai winner of the International Women of Courage Award

Twin towns and sister cities

Chiang Mai has agreements with the following sister cities:

 Uozu, Japan (8 August 1989)
 Saitama Prefecture, Japan (9 November 1992)
 Kunming, Yunnan, China (7 June 1999)
 Harbin, China (29 April 2008)
 Pyongyang, North Korea
  Da Lat, Lam Dong, Vietnam

Gallery

See also 
 Buddhist temples in Chiang Mai
 Chiang Mai Creative City
 Chiang Mai Initiative
 Royal Flora Ratchaphruek

References

External links 

 City of Chiang Mai
 

 
1296 establishments in Asia
Cities and towns in Chiang Mai province
Cities and towns in Thailand
Populated places in Chiang Mai province
Populated places established in the 1290s